Kamal Ibrahim Suleiman, better known as Kamal Tarbas, (born 1 January 1950, Omdurman, Sudan) is a Sudanese singer-songwriter. He has contributed to the development of popular music in Sudan in the 1970s by his personal, down-to-earth way of singing, backed by orchestras with western musical instruments.

Life and artistic career 
Tarbas grew up in an Islamic mystical environment and started working as a carpenter. Starting his career as a singer in the late 1960s, he developed his own Sudanese musical sub-genre, known as "al-fann al-shaabi" (the people's art) that has been described as "earthy populism" and down-to-earth. Further, he became known during the "Golden Years" of popular music in Sudan as "King of Sudanese Folk" music for his "laid-back voice," accompanied by Sudanese tom-tom rhythms and orchestras with western musical instruments. 

After a military coup in 1989, the imposition of sharia law by the Islamist government of Omar al-Bashir brought about the closing of music halls and outdoor concerts, as well as many other restrictions for musicians and their audiences. Despite this development, Tarbas has appeared on stage in support of Sudanese football teams and with other popular singers, such as Mohammed al Amin. He has continued to perform both at home in Sudan and in the Gulf Emirate of Abu Dhabi up to the present. 

On the compilation album Two Niles to Sing a Melody with songs by famous Sudanese musicians of the 1970s, he was featured with his song "Min Ozzalna seebak seeb" (Whoever humiliated us will cry). Another of his popular songs is "Gana El Baby" written by poet Othman Awad that likens his beloved to a papaya fruit. 

Further, he founded the Dar Karouma Centre for Music, named after the Sudanese musical pioneer Abdel Karim Karouma, in 1985. Also, Tarbas is known for his distinctive style of appearing on stage dressed in elegant abaya cloaks and large sized white turbans, measuring up to 9 meters. For this appearance and "shameful" personal coduct, he was criticized by members of the Union of Sudanese Musicians after a meeting in 2015.

Selected discography 
 Albums

 1985:  Ya kamar Bain
 1985:  Gana El Baby

 Singles

 Hban Qsay
 Ma Mank
 Ashan Baridk
 Gay Tftsh Al Mady
 Sayek Dalaloh
 Tany
 Nseem Shabal

See also 
 Music of Sudan
 List of Sudanese singers

References

External links

Kamal Tarbas on discogs
Kamal Tarbas tracks on last.fm
Short biography of Kamal Tarbas

Sudanese musicians

Living people
1950 births

20th-century Sudanese artists
20th-century Sudanese male singers